Robert Forrest is a Scottish three-time Sony Award winning dramatist (playwright) who has created many radio shows for BBC Radio and a stage play 'Jason and the Argonauts' for children that toured internationally and on Broadway. He has also adapted The Exorcist for BBC Radio 4 (Feb 2014).

History and personal life

Forrest lives in Strathaven, South Lanarkshire, Scotland.

Radio adaptations

 The Exorcist by William Peter Blatty, BBC Radio 4, February 2014
 The Great Gatsby by F. Scott Fitzgerald, BBC Radio 4, 6–13 May 2012
 The Pillow Book by Robert Forrest, BBC Radio 4, 2009–2012
 Journey into Fear by Eric Ambler, BBC Radio 7, 28 February – 4 March 2011
 Adam Bede by George Eliot, BBC Radio 7, 3–17 July 2010
 The Honourable Schoolboy by John le Carré, BBC Radio 4, 24 January – 7 February 2010
 The Secret Pilgrim by John le Carré, BBC Radio 4, 13–27 June 2010
 Smiley's People by John le Carré, BBC Radio 4, 11–25 April 2010
 The Voyage of the Demeter, BBC Radio 4, 23 February 2008, 31 October 2009
 Call for the Dead by John le Carré, BBC Radio 4, 23 May 2009
 Daniel Deronda by George Eliot, BBC Radio 7, 27–29 January 2009
 The Spy Who Came in From the Cold by John le Carré, BBC Radio 4, 5–19 July 2009
 The Weir of Hermiston by Robert Louis Stevenson, BBC Radio 7, 20 June 2009
 Parade's End by Ford Mattox Ford, BBC Radio 4, 2003
 The Case Book of Sherlock Holmes, BBC Radio 4, 1996
 The Strange Case of the Man in the Velvet Jacket by Robert Forrest, BBC Radio 3, 2011

Stage shows
 Lucia, Fifth Estate, Edinburgh, 1994 
 Jason and the Argonauts, Broadway, 2009 
 Poem in October, Glasgow and Edinburgh, 2009
 Curse of the Demeter, Glasgow, 2010

References

Scottish dramatists and playwrights
Year of birth missing (living people)
Living people